The University of Beira Interior (UBI;) is a public university located in the city of Covilhã, Portugal. It was created in 1979, and has about 6,879 students distributed across a multiplicity of graduation courses, awarding all academic degrees in fields ranging from medicine, biochemistry, biomedical sciences and industrial design to aeronautical engineering, fashion design, mathematics, economics and philosophy. The university is named after the historical Beira region, meaning , the most interior area of Beira, mainly composed by the district of Guarda and the district of Castelo Branco, in today's Centro region.

History 
In August 1973, following a major change in the national higher education system, the government established a polytechnical institution in Covilhã, the Polytechnic Institute of Covilhã (IPC - Instituto Politécnico da Covilhã), which was the first higher education institution in the city. Over the years, the IPC facilities, as well as the enrolment and staff, never ceased to grow. This growth and the region's needs, led the IPC to a remarkable level of achievements that granted it, in 1979, to be promoted, by the Portuguese Ministry of Education, to a higher institutional level, university institute. Seven years later, in 1986, the University Institute of Beira Interior was granted full university status and renamed University of Beira Interior.

Organisation 
For teaching and research purposes, UBI is organised into five faculties. The faculties are organised in departments:

The Faculty of Sciences includes the Department of Mathematics, Informatics, Physics, and Chemistry.
The Faculty of Engineering Sciences includes the departments of Textile Science and Technology, Paper Science and Technology, Electromechanical Engineering, Civil Engineering, and Aerospace Sciences.
The Faculty of Human and Social Sciences is made up of the Department of Management and Economics, Department of Sociology, Department of Education Sciences and the Department of Sports Sciences.
The Faculty of Arts and Letters includes the Department of Communication and Arts; and the Department of Letters
The Faculty of Health Sciences includes the Department of Medical Sciences.

All departments of the university grant the undergraduate  degree (licentiate's degree or bachelor's degree), which requires a three-year full-time study programme.

In order to supply its own needs and those of the local community itself, the university has also five centres: the Teaching and Learning Resources Centre (CREA); the Centre for Patrimonial Studies and Recovery (CEPP); the Computer Centre (CI); the Optics Centre (CO) and the Centre of Studies for Regional Development (CEDR) which establishes the interface between the university and the community providing consulting services to local institutions in the areas of regional development.

The Centro Hospitalar Universitário Cova da Beira (Cova da Beira University Hospital Center), with facilities in Covilhã and Fundão, is the teaching hospital of the University of Beira Interior. Hospitals of Castelo Branco and Guarda also collaborate with UBI's Faculty of Health Sciences.

Rankings

In 2020, the University of Beira Interior (UBI) maintained the status of one of the best international academies founded less than 50 years ago. The Times Higher Education Young University Rankings 2020 (THE-YUR) placed UBI at 151–200, within a list that analyzed 414 institutions of higher education around the world. UBI repeated the rank of the previous ranking, although the competition is increasing. In 2019, 351 academies had been analyzed, 63 less than this year. The rise in the number of institutions, however, did not jeopardize the position of UBI among the elite of the youngest universities from 66 countries on five continents. When analyzing the performance of the Portuguese institutions included in THE-YUR, UBI is in the second best level reached by the eight national higher education institutions, with only one ahead of it. In the parameter "Citations" it is even the best Portuguese academy on the list, appearing in 3rd place in "Internationalization". Compared to 2019, UBI improved its final score in four of the five major missions of universities, used for the construction of the study: "Teaching", "Research", "Knowledge Transfer" and "Internationalization". To prepare the Times Higher Education Young University Rankings are used the same 13 performance indicators of the main rankings of THE, as the World University Ranking, in which UBI is also included. Universities are evaluated on their main missions - teaching, research, knowledge transfer and internationalization - to allow the most comprehensive and balanced comparisons possible. In THE-YUR the weighting elements are calibrated to reflect the missions of young universities, with less emphasis on reputation surveys and more on factors such as research productivity, staff-to-student ratios and doctoral training, among others.

Rectoral Team 

The rector is elected by the General Council for a term of four years and is assisted by vice-rectors and pro-rectors in specific tasks.

 Rector: António Carreto Fidalgo
 Vice-rectors: Mário Lino Barata Raposo (finance area and projects), Paulo Rodrigues Lima Vargas Moniz (research area) and João Manuel Messias Canavilhas (teaching, internationalisation and career prospects)
 Pro-rectors: Isabel Maria Romano da Cunha (quality area), José Carlos Páscoa Marques (project area) and Manuel Carlos Loureiro Lemos (coordination with the community in the health area)

Courses

1st-cycle degrees 
Bioengineering
Biochemistry
Biotechnology 
Biomedical Sciences
Cinema 
Communication Sciences
Computer Science and Engineering
Fashion Design
Industrial Design 
Multimedia Design
Economics
Electrical and Computer Engineering
Electromechanical Engineering
Portuguese and Spanish Studies
Management
Industrial Chemistry
Marketing
Optometry – Vision Sciences
Political Science and International Relations
Psychology
Sciences of Culture
Sociology
Sports Sciences
Web Informatics

Integrated Master's degrees 
 Architecture
 Civil Engineering
 Aeronautical Engineering
 Medicine
 Pharmaceutical Sciences

2nd-cycle degrees 
 Biochemistry
 Bioengineering
 Biomedical Sciences
 Biotechnology
 Branding and Fashion Design
 Cinema
 Clinical and Health Psychology
 Computer Science and Engineering
 Fashion Design
 Industrial and Technological Design
 Multimedia Design
 Didactic, Cultural, Linguistic and Literary Studies
 Economics
 Electrical and Computer Engineering
 Electromechanical Engineering
 Entrepreneurship and Social Innovation
 Teaching of Physical Education in Basic and Secondary School
 Entrepreneurship and Firm Creation
 Entrepreneurship and Social Service
 Game Design and Development
 Geographic Information Systems
 Industrial Chemistry
 Industrial Engineering and Management
 Journalism
 Lusophone Studies
 Management
 Management of Health Units
 Marketing
 Mathematics for Teachers
 Medicinal Chemistry
 Optometry in Vision Sciences
 Pedagogical Supervision
 Political Science
 International Relations
 Sociology: Exclusion and Social Policies
 Sports Sciences
 Strategic Communication: Advertising and Public Relations
 Teaching of Mathematics in the 3rd Cycle of Basic Education and in Secondary Education
 Teaching of Philosophy in Secondary Education
 Teaching of Physics and Chemistry in the 3rd Cycle of Basic Education and in Secondary Education
 Teaching of Portuguese and Spanish in the 3rd Cycle of Basic Education and in Secondary School
 Teaching of the Visual Arts in the 3rd Cycle of Basic Education and Secondary Education
 Textile Engineering

3rd-cycle degrees 
 Advanced Materials and Processing
 Aeronautical Engineering
 Biochemistry
 Biomedicine
 Chemistry
 Civil Engineering
 Communication Sciences
 Communication Studies: Technology, Culture and Society
 Computer Engineering
 Economics
 Education
 Electrical and Computer Engineering
 Fashion Design
 Industrial Engineering and Management
 Management
 Marketing and Strategy
 Mathematics and Applications
 Mechanical Engineering
 Medicine
 Paper Engineering
 Pharmaceutical Sciences
 Philosophy
 Physics
 Political Science
 Psychology
 Sociology
 Sports Sciences
 Textile Engineering

Enrolment and staff 
Current figures show an enrolment of approximately 7000 students from all over the country plus 693 professors and lecturers.

Students coming from other European Union member-states and PALOP countries accounts for nearly 200.

Teaching and learning methods 
All courses are taught in Portuguese language, and the teaching process is undertaken using a mixture of theoretical and practical processes. Theoretical lessons are usually supported by:

 Theoretical/Practical lessons where the students guided by the teacher have the chance to discuss and resolve problems.
 Practical lessons, where the students are challenged to solve practical problems in laboratories, ateliers or computer facilities and able to apply the theoretical knowledge that they already understood and learned.

Academic year 
The academic year at UBI consists of two semesters. The first (autumn and winter semester) is 20 weeks long. It runs from mid-September to mid-February and includes classes, work assessment and examinations of students. The second (spring and summer semester) is 20 weeks long. It runs from mid -February to mid-July and includes classes, work assessment and examinations of students. Christmas holidays last two weeks, and Easter break is one week.

University campus 

Over the years, the UBI had a remarkable evolution and nowadays it is a modern university full of well-equipped laboratories, ateliers, libraries, computer rooms, research centres, and offering a wide range of activities through the students' union (Associação Académica da Universidade da Beira Interior) and university social services.

The university academic campus is well integrated in the city urban network and it has unique characteristics based on Covilhã industrial roots. The city was an important textile centre, once known as the "Portuguese Manchester". By the turn of the 21st century, the city had witnessed a restructuring of this industry. However, at the same time many factories were not able to meet the requirements of the global market and had to close down. Some of their former buildings, after being renovated by the University of Beira Interior, started the 21st century serving the purpose of educating the Portuguese society.

Over 250,000 m2 of buildings are dedicated to academic activities and social services. The university campus is divided into several spaces, called , which are spread through the city establishing a real symbiosis between the city and the university as a public institution.

Pólo I – The main building is a 17th-century textile factory that was renovated to house part of the university services, classrooms and offices. New buildings near have been erected over the years to keep up the continuous growth of the UBI. Due to a diligent renovation work this set of buildings are considered historical, cultural and architectonical outstanding pieces of industrial archaeology. Among this sector the following units are located: the Faculty of Arts and Humanities, the Faculty of Sciences, the Faculty of Engineering Sciences, the Wool Museum, the Computer Centre, the Optics Centre, the São Martinho Chapel, the Main Library, the Bank, the Teaching and Learning Resources Centre (Multimedia Centre) and the Centre For Heritage Studies and Recovery.
Pólo II – On a hill, less than 1 km from Pólo I, and meeting the UBI need for constant expansion, an area was created where several central infrastructures, as the emblematic 16th century convent that nowadays houses the Rectory, the administration services and the international relations office. In the same area are also located the academic residences, Santo Antonio cafeteria, the sport halls, the social affairs centre and the centre of studies for regional development. The Department of Sports and Science is also located nearby.
Pólo III – This is where the Faculty of Health Sciences is located. It has a total area of 16,000 m2 situated nearby the Central Hospital in a distance of 1 km far from Pólo I.
Pólo IV – This area is located in northern part of the city and was created to facilitate the expansion of the university. It houses the Faculty of Human and Social Sciences, the Cyber Centre  and a residence hall with Snack Bar.
Libraries – UBI has three libraries. The Main Library is located in Pólo I following the aim of meeting the students' needs. All libraries of UBI have an information desk where one can obtain information and help. Once the Library Card is issued, students can use it to borrow books from any library. The Main Library offers a wide range of services spread among 3 different floors. Textbooks and course materials, scientific publications, bibliographies and reference works in all subjects taught at the university are available. Among other services, students can use the individual study and reading rooms, Inter-Library loan service, photocopy services, scanners, CD-ROM, Videos, DVD or consult the Library Database and Internet (200 computers).

UBI residence halls 
The UBI maintains seven residence halls. One of the residence halls is located in Pólo II, 5 minutes of walking distance from the university's main buildings (Pólo I) and the other (Residência Pedro Álvares Cabral) is located near the Pólo IV. All the rooms are equipped with closets, desks, chairs, beds and central heating. One or two students are assigned to each room. The Students' Social Affairs Centre manages all the university housing offers.

Students' union 
The students' union, AAUBI – Associação Académica da Universidade da Beira Interior , is headquartered within the old part of the town, near Santa Maria church. The union also has its office in Pólo I, two floors upstairs from the bank.

The students' union (AAUBI) offers a wide range of activities concerning sports, culture and leisure. During the whole year there are many indoor events such like chess meetings or activities in sports halls as climbing, volleyball, basketball, football, badminton and table tennis.

A freshmen reception week, organised by the students' union of the University of Beira Interior, takes place in November and includes a parade through town (the ) and several concerts.

Online radio, television and journal 
The university has an online radio, Rádio Universitária da Beira Interior , an online television, Televisão Universitária da Beira Interior , and an online journal, Urbi et Orbi .

Athletics 
The University of Beira Interior has two indoor sports pavilions, among other sports facilities. Competitive varsity sports teams of UBI include badminton, basketball, futsal, handball, rugby union and volleyball.

Wool museum 

The UBI adapted the buildings of the former  (Royal Textile Factory), an important national woollens manufacturer established by Marquês de Pombal in 1764.

In 1975, during the recovery and adaptation works of the building, archaeological remains of the old textile mill were discovered. The vats of the former dye-house were found. The discovery was classified as a part of the national cultural heritage and it was carefully recovered and restored. According to the museum's educational role, the discovered structures are helping to portray the dyeing processes used in Portugal in the second half of the 18th century.

Guided tours are available (free for UBI students). The museum is open on weekdays except Monday, from 09:30 to midday and from 14:30 to 18:00.

See also 
List of universities in Portugal
Higher education in Portugal
Air Cargo Challenge

References

External links 

University of Beira Interior
UBI (Pólo I) viewed from satellite
UBI on Facebook

Educational institutions established in 1979
Beira
1979 establishments in Portugal
Buildings and structures in Castelo Branco District
Covilhã
Medical education in Portugal
Medical and health organisations based in Portugal